Estonian Squash Federation (abbreviation ESF) is one of the sport governing bodies in Estonia which deals with squash.

ESF is a member of World Squash Federation (WSF).

References

External links
 

Sports governing bodies in Estonia